The 2004 United States House of Representatives Elections in Florida were held on November 2, 2004 to determine who would represent the state of Florida in the United States House of Representatives. Representatives are elected for two-year terms; those elected served in the 109th Congress from January 3, 2005 to January 3, 2007. The election coincided with the 2004 U.S. presidential election as well as an election to the United States Senate.

Florida had twenty-five seats in the House, apportioned according to the 2000 United States Census. Its delegation to the 108th Congress of 2003-2005 consisted of eighteen Republicans and seven Democrats. In 2004, no districts changed party control, leaving the congressional delegation as an 18-7 split favoring the Republicans.

The following members of Congress went unopposed in the 2004 election and thus their election is not reported below:
John Mica (R-FL-07)
Robert Wexler (D-FL-19)
Alcee Hastings (D-FL-23)
Tom Feeney (R-FL-24)
Mario Diaz-Balart (R-FL-25)

Overview

District 1

Incumbent Republican representative Jeff Miller, who was initially elected in a special election in 2001, ran for re-election in this staunchly conservative district based in the Florida Panhandle. Miller easily defeated Democratic challenger Mark Coutu.

District 2

The incumbent was Democrat Allen Boyd, first elected to this seat in 1997. Other contestants in this race included Republican challenger Bev Kilmer, who had served in the Florida House of Representatives, and write-in candidate T. A. Frederick.

Shortly before the election, a company owned by Kilmer's husband sued Boyd for defamation of character. Nonetheless, Boyd was reelected with slightly under 62 percent of the vote.

District 3

Democrat Corrine Brown, the incumbent since 1993, faced no major-party opposition and easily won re-election over write-in candidate Johnny Brown.

District 4

Incumbent Republican Ander Crenshaw faced only marginal opposition from the write-in campaign of perennial candidate Richard Grayson. Crenshaw easily won another term.

District 5

Incumbent Republican Ginny Brown-Waite easily won re-election against attorney Robert Whittel in a race that was not viewed as competitive.

District 6

Encompassing North Central Florida, this conservative district is represented by incumbent Republican Congressman Cliff Stearns. Stearns, seeking a ninth term, faced off against Democrat Dave Bruderly and won the election by a wide margin.

District 8

Republican Congressman Ric Keller, seeking a third term, faced off against libertarian Democrat Stephen Murray. Keller won re-election with over 60% of the vote.

District 9

Republican incumbent Congressman Michael Bilirakis ran for a twelfth term. Bilirakis faced no major-party opposition in this Republican-leaning district.

District 10

Longtime incumbent Republican Bill Young won re-election over Democrat Bob Derry with almost 70% of the vote.

District 11

Incumbent Democratic Congressman Jim Davis ran for a fifth term in this liberal district based in Tampa. He faced no Republican challenger.

District 12

Incumbent Republican Adam Putnam won a third term, defeating Democrat Bob Hagenmaier. Putnam, who was the youngest member of the U.S. Congress before this election, received more than 10 times the campaign donations as his opponent and cruised to an easy victory.

District 13

Incumbent Republican Katherine Harris sought a second term and defeated Democratic challenger Jan Schneider.

District 14

This seat had been vacant since Porter Goss resigned on September 23 to serve as the director of the CIA. Republican Connie Mack IV won the open seat against Democratic candidate Robert Neeld in this solidly conservative district. Mack, the son of former U.S. Senator Connie Mack III, was aided by name recognition and fundraising connections en route to an easy victory.

District 15

Incumbent Republican Dave Weldon sought election to a sixth term in Congress. Weldon defeated the Democratic candidate, retired physicist Simon Pristoop, with 65% of the vote.

District 16

Incumbent Republican Mark Foley ran for a sixth term. He defeated Democrat Jeff Fisher by a wide margin.

District 17

Incumbent Democrat Kendrick Meek was re-elected to a second term in this heavily Democratic district. He faced no Republican challenger.

District 18

Incumbent Republican Congresswoman Ileana Ros-Lehtinen sought a ninth term and easily defeated Democratic nominee Sam Sheldon.

District 20

Democratic incumbent Peter Deutsch decided to run for the U.S. Senate instead of seeking re-election. Democrat Debbie Wasserman Schultz won the open seat with over 70% of the vote.

District 21

Incumbent Republican Lincoln Diaz-Balart ran for a seventh term in this suburban district. Diaz-Balart faced no Democratic challenger and easily won re-election.

District 22

Incumbent Republican Clay Shaw ran for a thirteenth term. Jim Stork was the Democratic nominee, but withdrew from the race before election night, citing health issues. Stork's name remained on the ballot, but votes for Stork were counted for Robin Rorapaugh, a staffer for Congressman Peter Deutsch. Shaw easily won re-election.

References

2004
Florida
United States House of Representatives